Cupid Car Club, also known as Cupid Car Club M.P., was a short-lived American post-hardcore band consisting of Ian Svenonius on vocals, James Canty on drums, Steve Gamboa on guitar (all of which were previously members of Nation of Ulysses and later went on to form The Make-Up), and Kim Thompson (of The Delta 72) on bass and vocals.

They released one 7-inch EP on Kill Rock Stars, called Join our Club.  Cupid Car Club also appeared on the Rock Stars Kill and Some Songs compilations, also under the Kill Rock Stars label.

The band's lyrical content, album art, and promotional material tended to stray towards a morbid playfulness, containing many references to topics such as suicide, child custody, and cults.

Join our Club

Join our Club, sometimes known as Werewolves!, was the only EP from the short-lived band Cupid Car Club.

The track "Grape Juice Plus" borrows its name from the term used by Dr. Lewis Dickson to describe wine to Zira in Escape from the Planet of the Apes.  Also, the lyrics "Did you have the dream now about the boy" and "Don't you got it good now so I can shoot my little girl" are direct reference to 1991's The Rapture (film).  Svenonius has a penchant for obscure film references and name-dropping (most obvious in David Candy's Play Power).

Track listing
"Edge of the Envelope" − 2:10
"Vapor Rub-Out"
"Child Custody Commandos"
"Grape Juice Plus" − 3:49

Other appearances on compilations
{| class="wikitable"
!align="left|Year
!align="left|Title
!align="left|Track(s)
!align="left|Label
!align="left|Other
|-
|1994
|Rock Stars Kill
|
"M.P. Skulkers"
|Kill Rock Stars
|Consists of a CD, LP, and a 7 inch.  "M.P. Skulkers" appears only on CD and LP pressings. "M.P. Skulkers" does not appear on any other release, including Join our Club.
|-
|1997
|Some Songs
|
"Grape Juice Plus"
|Kill Rock Stars
|
|}

References

External links 
Entry on Southern Records
Cupid Car Club Fan site

American post-hardcore musical groups